BLA or bla may refer to:

Organizations

Military 
 British Liberation Army, an historic British Army force in World War II

Militant and paramilitary
 Balochistan Liberation Army, a Baloch militant organization
 Bavarian Liberation Army, a purported Austrian militant organization
 Black Liberation Army, a Black Power revolutionary organization in the United States (U.S.)

Places and businesses

Education
 Biblioteca Las Américas, a library in Mercedes, Texas, U.S.
 Boston Latin Academy, a high school in Boston, Massachusetts, U.S.

Transportation
 General José Antonio Anzoátegui International Airport, Barcelona, Venezuela, by IATA code
 Blue Air, ICAO airline designator code
 Baltimore and Annapolis Railroad's reporting mark

Geographical locations
 Brainerd Lakes Area in Minnesota, U.S.

 Bla, Ivory Coast, a village in Sassandra-Marahoué District, Ivory Coast
 Bla, Mali, a town
 Blå, a jazz club in Oslo, Norway

Other uses
 Biologics license application, which is submitted to the U.S. Food and Drug Administration for approval
 Bachelor of Liberal Arts, an undergraduate university degree
 Basolateral amygdala, a structure in the brain
 Siksika language ISO 639 language code

See also
Blah (disambiguation)
 Blaa, a doughy, white bread bun particular to Waterford City and County, Ireland